Events from the year 2013 in Nepal.

Incumbents
President: Ram Baran Yadav 
Prime Minister: Baburam Bhattarai (until 14 March), Khil Raj Regmi (acting) (starting 14 March)
Vice President: Parmanand Jha
Chief Justice: Khil Raj Regmi

Incumbents
 14 March - Khil Raj Regmi became acting Prime minister.

Events
 19 November - Nepali Congress wins 196 of 575 elected seats in the Nepalese Constituent Assembly election

Deaths
 9 September - Phatteman Rajbhandari, vocalist and musician
 31 October - Jagadish Ghimire, writer and political analyst
 24 December - Hutta Ram Baidya, Bagmati conservation activist

See also
Years in India
Years in China

References

 
Nepal
Years of the 21st century in Nepal
2010s in Nepal
Nepal